Horsley Priory was a Benedictine priory of nuns in Surrey. It is thought to relate to the priory attested at "Horslege" "in the time of Richard I or Queen Joan" in the monastic catalogue attributed to Gervase of Canterbury. Later historians stated that "there is no trace of such thing, unless it may be looked for at Rowbarnes".

References

Benedictine nunneries in England
Buildings and structures in Surrey